is a Japanese voice actor.

Filmography

Television animation
Cowboy Bebop (1998) as Gang B; Police 2; Security
Mobile Suit Gundam SEED (2002) as Modine (ep 37); Representative Homura
Yakitate!! Japan (2004) as Doctor
Naruto (2005) as Hokushin
Onihei (2017) as Chūsuke Sajima
Legend of the Galactic Heroes: Die Neue These (2018) as Staaden

Unknown date
Berserk as Aide (Ep. 4); Follower (Ep. 5); General B (Ep. 11)
Boogiepop Phantom as Teacher (eps 2, 3)
Chrono Crusade as Police Inspector (ep 1,2)
Dirty Pair Flash as SCC Computer
Dominion as Golfer
Ergo Proxy as Iggy
Getbackers as insurance company man (ep 10)
Gravion as Angle
Gundam Evolve as Mazaku/Hadou Musha Mazaku
Knight Hunters Eternity (ep 7)
Lupin III: Stolen Lupin as Hakuryuu
Magical Shopping Arcade Abenobashi as Banker Kashiwagi
Mobile Suit Gundam SEED Destiny as Representative Homura (ep 20)
No-Rin as Kiichi Nakazawa
R.O.D the TV as Language Teacher (ep. 6)
Shrine of the Morning Mist as Client (ep 18)
Stratos 4 (TV) as Mania #3; Mikaze's father
Sukeban Deka

OVA
Stratos 4 (????) (Otaku D)

Video Games
Batman: Arkham Knight (2015, Japanese dub) (James Gordon)
Resident Evil 7: Biohazard (2017, Japanese dub) (Alan Douglas)

Tokusatsu
Uchu Sentai Kyuranger (2017) as Dogyun (ep 32)

Dubbing
The Art of Self-Defense (Henry (David Zellner))
Avengers: Endgame (Brock Rumlow (Frank Grillo))
Captain America: Civil War (Brock Rumlow (Frank Grillo))
C.B. Strike (Jerry Waldegrave (Dominic Mafham))
Das Experiment (Schütte (Oliver Stokowski))
Donnie Darko (Jim Cunningham (Patrick Swayze))
Fires (Duncan Simpson (Richard Roxburgh))
Fortitude (Professor Charlie Stoddart (Christopher Eccleston))
Indiana Jones and the Temple of Doom (2009 Wowow edition) (Mola Ram (Amrish Puri))
Interstellar (Principal (David Oyelowo))
Logan (Zander Rice (Richard E. Grant))
Mindscape (Robert (Richard Dillane))
Mission: Impossible – Ghost Protocol (Anatoly Sidorov (Vladimir Mashkov))
Night at the Museum: Secret of the Tomb (Archibald Stanley (Matt Frewer))
Out for a Kill (Ed Grey (Corey Johnson))
Resident Evil: Extinction (Dr. Alexander Isaacs (Iain Glen))
Resident Evil: The Final Chapter (Dr. Alexander Isaacs (Iain Glen))
Santa's Slay (Grandpa (Robert Culp))
Thirteen Days (Robert McNamara (Dylan Baker))
Transformers: Age of Extinction (Drift)
Vincenzo (Han Seung-hyuk (Jo Han-chul))

References

External links 
 

1960 births
Living people
Japanese male voice actors
Male voice actors from Osaka Prefecture
20th-century Japanese male actors
21st-century Japanese male actors
Ken Production voice actors